Saidabad Rural District is in the Central District of Savojbolagh County, Alborz province, Iran. At the census of 2006, its population (including the villages of Seyfabad-e Bozorg and Seyfabad-e Khaleseh, which were fused to create the city of Golsar) was 31,576 in 7,946 households, and in the most recent census of 2016, it had decreased to 26,979 in 8,125 households. The largest of its 29 villages is Qasemabad-e Bozorg, with 6,142 people.

References 

Savojbolagh County

Rural Districts of Alborz Province

Populated places in Alborz Province

Populated places in Savojbolagh County